Duel Masters Rev. is a Japanese manga series written by Shido Kanzaki and illustrated by Shinsuke Takahashi. It is a spin-off of the media franchise Duel Masters. It was serialized in Shogakukan's Weekly Shōnen Sunday from August 2012 to July 2013, with its chapters collected in five tankōbon volumes.

Publication
Duel Masters Rev. is written by Shido Kanzaki and illustrated by Shinsuke Takahashi. It was serialized in Shogakukan's Weekly Shōnen Sunday from August 29, 2012, to July 10, 2013. It is the first Duel Masters manga to be published in a shōnen magazine, with the other manga series published in Shogakukan's children manga magazine CoroCoro Comic and its spinoffs. Shogakukan collected its chapters in five tankōbon volumes, released from December 18, 2012, to October 18, 2013.

The manga was licensed in France by Tonkam in 2015.

Volume list

References

External links
Official website at Web Sunday 

Card games in anime and manga
Fantasy anime and manga
Shogakukan manga
Shōnen manga